Brookfield is a hamlet in Madison County, New York, United States. Brookfield has a post office with ZIP code 13314. Beaver Creek flows through the hamlet. The hamlet was once known as "Baileys Corners" and "Clarkville" (named after Joseph Clark).

References

Hamlets in Madison County, New York
Hamlets in New York (state)